Pure and Applied Chemistry is the official journal for the International Union of Pure and Applied Chemistry (IUPAC). It is published monthly by Walter de Gruyter and contains recommendations and reports, and lectures from symposia.

References

Chemistry journals
Publications established in 1960
De Gruyter academic journals